In United States law, habeas corpus is a recourse challenging the reasons or conditions of a person's confinement under color of law.  A petition for habeas corpus is filed with a court that has jurisdiction over the custodian, and if granted, a writ is issued directing the custodian to bring the confined person before the court for examination into those reasons or conditions. The Suspension Clause of the United States Constitution specifically included the English common law procedure in Article One, Section 9, clause 2, which demands that "The privilege of the writ of habeas corpus shall not be suspended, unless when in cases of rebellion or invasion the public safety may require it."

United States law affords persons the right to petition the federal courts for a writ of habeas corpus. Individual states also afford persons the ability to petition their own state court systems for habeas corpus pursuant to their respective constitutions and laws when held or sentenced by state authorities.

Federal habeas review did not extend to those in state custody until almost a century after the nation's founding. During the Civil War and Reconstruction, as later during the War on Terrorism, the right to petition for a writ of habeas corpus was substantially curtailed for persons accused of engaging in certain conduct. In reaction to the former, and to ensure state courts enforced federal law, a Reconstruction Act for the first time extended the right of federal court habeas review to those in the custody of state courts (prisons and jails), expanding the writ essentially to all imprisoned on American soil. The federal habeas statute that resulted, with substantial amendments, is now at 28 U.S.C. § 2241. For many decades, the great majority of habeas petitions reviewed in federal court have been filed by those confined in state prisons by sentence of a state court for state crimes (e.g., murder, rape, robbery, etc.), since in the American system, most crimes have historically been a matter of state law.

The right of habeas corpus is not a right against unlawful arrest, but rather a right to be released from imprisonment after such arrest. If one believes the arrest is without legal merit and subsequently refuses to come willingly, he still may be guilty of resisting arrest, which can sometimes be a crime in and of itself (even if the initial arrest itself was illegal) depending on the state.

Origin
Habeas corpus derives from the English common law where the first recorded usage was in 1305, in the reign of King Edward I of England. The procedure for the issuing of writs of habeas corpus was first codified by the Habeas Corpus Act 1679, following judicial rulings which had restricted the effectiveness of the writ. A previous act had been passed in 1640 to overturn a ruling that the command of the Queen was a sufficient answer to a petition of habeas corpus. Winston Churchill, in his chapter on the English Common Law in The Birth of Britain, explains the process thus:

The writ of habeas corpus was issued by a superior court in the name of the Monarch, and commanded the addressee (a lower court, sheriff, or private subject) to produce the prisoner before the Royal courts of law. Petitions for habeas corpus could be made by the prisoner himself or by a third party on his behalf, and as a result of the Habeas Corpus Acts could be made regardless of whether the court was in session, by presenting the petition to a judge.

The 1679 Act remains important in 21st century cases. This Act and the historical body of British practice that relies upon it has been used to interpret the habeas rights granted by the United States Constitution, while taking into account the understanding of the writ held by the framers of the Constitution.

At the 1787 Constitutional Convention Habeas Corpus was first introduced with a series of propositions on August 20 by Charles Pinckney, a delegate from South Carolina.  Habeas Corpus was discussed and voted on substantively on August 28, 1787, where the first vote of the motion in favor of Habeas Corpus passed unanimously, and the second part passed by a vote of 7 to 3, for making Habeas Corpus Constitutionally-recognized.

Federal law
The Suspension Clause of Article One does not expressly establish a right to the writ of habeas corpus; rather, it prevents Congress from restricting it. There has been much scholarly debate over whether the Clause positively establishes a right under the federal constitution, merely exists to prevent Congress from prohibiting state courts from granting the writ, or protects a pre-existing common law right enforceable by federal judges. However, in the cases of Immigration and Naturalization Service v. St. Cyr (2001), and Boumediene v. Bush (2008) the U.S. Supreme Court suggested that the Suspension Clause protects "the writ as it existed in 1789", that is, as a writ which federal judges could issue in the exercise of their common law authority.

Regardless of whether the writ is positively guaranteed by the constitution, habeas corpus was first established by statute in the Judiciary Act of 1789. This statutory writ applied only to those held in custody by officials of the executive branch of the federal government and not to those held by state governments, which independently afford habeas corpus pursuant to their respective constitutions and laws. From 1789 until 1866, the federal writ of habeas corpus was largely restricted to prisoners in federal custody, at a time when no direct appeals from federal criminal convictions were provided for by law. Habeas corpus remained the only means for judicial review of federal capital convictions until 1889, and the only means for review of federal convictions for other "infamous crimes" until 1891. Until 1983 the writ of habeas corpus remained the only way that decisions of military courts could be reviewed by the Supreme Court.

The authority of federal courts to review the claims of prisoners in state custody was not clearly established until Congress adopted a statute (28 U.S.C. § 2254) granting federal courts that authority in 1867, as part of the post-Civil War Reconstruction. The U.S. Supreme Court in the case of Waley v. Johnson (1942) interpreted this authority broadly to allow the writ to be used to challenge convictions or sentences in violation of a defendant's constitutional rights where no other remedy was available.

The U.S. Congress grants federal district courts, the Supreme Court, and all Article III federal judges, acting in their own right, jurisdiction under 28 U.S.C. § 2241 to issue writs of habeas corpus to release prisoners held by any government entity within the country from custody, subject to certain limitations, if the prisoner
 Is in custody under or by color of the authority of the United States or is committed for trial before some court thereof; or
 Is in custody for an act done or omitted in pursuance of an Act of Congress, or an order, process, judgment or decree court or judge of the United States; or
 Is in custody in violation of the Constitution or laws or treaties of the United States; or
 Being a citizen of a foreign state and domiciled therein is in custody for an act done or omitted under any alleged right, title, authority, privilege, protection, or exemption claimed under the commission, order or sanction of any foreign state, or under color thereof, the validity and effect of which depend upon the law of nations; or
 It is necessary to bring said persons into court to testify or for trial.

In 1950s and 1960s, decisions by the Warren Court greatly expanded the use and scope of the federal writ largely due to the "constitutionalizing" of criminal procedure by applying the Bill of Rights, in part, to state courts using the incorporation doctrine. This afforded state prisoners many more opportunities to claim that their convictions were unconstitutional, which provided grounds for habeas corpus relief. In the last thirty years, decisions by the Burger and Rehnquist Courts have somewhat narrowed the writ.

The Antiterrorism and Effective Death Penalty Act of 1996 (AEDPA) further limited the use of the federal writ by imposing a one-year statute of limitations and dramatically increasing the federal judiciary's deference to decisions previously made in state court proceedings either on appeal or in a state court habeas corpus action. One of AEDPA's most controversial changes is the requirement that any constitutional right invoked to vacate a state court conviction rooted in a mistake of law by the state court must have "resulted in a decision that was contrary to, or involved an unreasonable application of, clearly established Federal law, as determined by the Supreme Court of the United States" (emphasis added). Thus, a U.S. Court of Appeals must ignore its own precedents and affirm a state court decision contrary to its precedents, if the U.S. Supreme Court has never squarely addressed a particular issue of federal law.

Suspension during the Civil War

Presidential suspension of habeas corpus
On April 27, 1861, the right of habeas corpus was unilaterally suspended by President Abraham Lincoln in Maryland during the American Civil War. Lincoln had received word that anti-war Maryland officials intended to destroy the railroad tracks between Annapolis and Philadelphia, which was a vital supply line for the army preparing to fight the South. Indeed, soon after, the Maryland legislature would simultaneously vote to stay in the Union and to close these rail lines, in an apparent effort to prevent war between its northern and southern neighbors. Lincoln did not issue a sweeping order; it only applied to the Maryland route. Lincoln chose to suspend the writ over a proposal to bombard Baltimore, favored by his General-in-Chief Winfield Scott. Lincoln was also motivated by requests by generals to set up military courts to rein in his political opponents, "Copperheads", or Peace Democrats, so named because they did not want to resort to war to force the southern states back into the Union, as well as to intimidate those in the Union who supported the Confederate cause. Congress was not yet in session to consider a suspension of the writs; however, when it came into session it failed to pass a bill favored by Lincoln to sanction his suspensions. During this period one sitting U.S. Congressman from the opposing party, as well as the mayor, police chief, entire Board of Police, and the city council of Baltimore were arrested without charge and imprisoned indefinitely without trial.

Lincoln's action was rapidly challenged in court and overturned by the U.S. Circuit Court of Appeals in Maryland (led by the Chief Justice of the Supreme Court, Roger B. Taney) in Ex parte Merryman. Chief Justice Taney ruled the suspension unconstitutional, stating that only Congress could suspend habeas corpus. Lincoln and his Attorney General Edward Bates not only ignored the Chief Justice's order, but when Lincoln's dismissal of the ruling was criticized in an editorial by prominent Baltimore newspaper editor Frank Key Howard, they had the editor also arrested by federal troops without charge or trial. The troops imprisoned Howard, who was Francis Scott Key's grandson, in Fort McHenry, which, as he noted, was the same fort where the Star Spangled Banner had been waving "o'er the land of the free" in his grandfather's song. In 1863, Howard wrote about his experience as a "political prisoner" at Fort McHenry in the book Fourteen Months in the American Bastille; two of the publishers selling the book were then arrested.

When Congress convened in July 1861 it failed to support Lincoln's unilateral suspension of habeas corpus. A joint resolution was introduced into the Senate to approve of the president's suspension of the writ of habeas corpus, but filibustering by Senate Democrats, who did not support it, and opposition to its imprecise wording by Senator Lyman Trumbull prevented a vote on the resolution before the end of the first session, and the resolution was not taken up again. Trumbull himself introduced a bill to suspend habeas corpus, but failed on getting a vote before the end of the first session.

Shortly thereafter, on September 17, 1861, the day the Maryland legislature was to reconvene, Lincoln imprisoned pro-Confederate members of the Maryland General Assembly without charges or hearings in further defiance of the Chief Justice's ruling. Thus, the legislative session had to be cancelled.

On February 14, 1862, the war was firmly in progress and Lincoln ordered most prisoners released, putting an end to court challenges for the time being. He again suspended habeas corpus on his own authority in September that same year, however, in response to resistance to his calling up of the militia.

Congressional suspension of habeas corpus
When Congress met again in December 1862, the House of Representatives passed a bill indemnifying the president for his suspension of habeas corpus. The Senate amended the bill, and the compromise reported out of the conference committee altered it to remove the indemnity and to suspend habeas corpus on Congress's own authority. That bill, the Habeas Corpus Suspension Act, was signed into law March 3, 1863. Lincoln exercised his powers under it in September, suspending habeas corpus throughout the Union in any case involving prisoners of war, spies, traitors, or military personnel. The suspension of habeas corpus remained in effect until Andrew Johnson revoked it on December 1, 1865.

General Ambrose E. Burnside had former-Congressman Clement Vallandigham arrested in May 1863 for continuing to express sympathy for the Confederate cause after having been warned to cease doing so. Vallandigham was tried by a military tribunal and sentenced to two years in a military prison. Lincoln quickly commuted his sentence to banishment to the Confederacy. Vallandigham appealed his sentence, arguing that the Enrollment Act did not authorize his trial by a military tribunal rather than in ordinary civilian courts, that he was not ordinarily subject to court martial, and that Gen. Burnside could not expand the jurisdiction of military courts on his own authority. The Supreme Court did not address the substance of Vallandigham's appeal, instead denying that it possessed the jurisdiction to review the proceedings of military tribunals without explicit congressional authorization.

In 1864, Lambdin P. Milligan and four others were accused of planning to steal Union weapons and invade Union prisoner-of-war camps and were sentenced to hang by a military court.  However, their execution was not set until May 1865, so they were able to argue the case after the war ended. In Ex parte Milligan (1866), the U.S. Supreme Court decided that Congress's 1863 suspension of the writ did not empower the President to try to convict citizens before military tribunals where the civil courts were open and operational. This was one of the key Supreme Court Cases of the American Civil War that dealt with wartime civil liberties and martial law.

In the Confederacy
In the Confederacy, Jefferson Davis also suspended habeas corpus and imposed martial law. Shortly after his inauguration as president of the Confederacy, an act of the Confederate Congress of February 27, 1862, was passed authorizing Davis to suspend the writ of habeas corpus and declare martial law "in such towns, cities, and military districts as shall, in his judgment, be in such danger of attack by the enemy". The Confederate Congress passed a limiting act two months to restrict the suspension of the writ "to arrests made by the authorities of the Confederate Government, or for offences against the same" and to add a sunset clause providing that authorization to suspend habeas corpus would expire 30 days after the next meeting of Congress.

In various proclamations and orders beginning in 1862, Davis suspended the writ and declared martial law in parts of Virginia (including the Confederate capital of Richmond, Norfolk, Portsmouth, Petersburg, and elsewhere). Davis also suspended the writ in East Tennessee;  in this region, Thomas A.R. Nelson was arrested by the Confederate military and held as a political prisoner before being released on the condition that he cease criticizing the Confederate government. Suspensions of civil process in the confederacy were used against suspected Unionists, particularly in border states. Historian Barton A. Myers notes that  after the Confederacy imposed nationwide conscription, "the difference between arrest for political dissidence and conscription into the military became largely semantic, as anyone accused of Unionism was almost always first taken to a training camp where they were monitored and hazed under guard."

Davis also suspended the writ in North Carolina (June 1862) and in Atlanta (in September 1862). The Confederate Congress passed re-authorizing legislation twice more, in October 1862 and February 1864. Davis suspended habeas corpus in Arkansas and the Indian Territory in January 1863. Although Davis had initially been resistant to the idea, he suspended the writ after receiving a telegram from General Theophilus Holmes complaining that his region was filed with disloyal persons and deserters, and that he could not enforce conscription.

At least 2,672 civilians were subject to military arrest in the Confederacy over the course of its history, although this is likely an undercount given the incompleteness of records. Civil War historian Mark E. Neely Jr. suggests that "there seems to be no difference in the arrest rate in those periods when the Confederate Congress refuse to authorization suspension of the writ of habeas corpus and those periods was authorized. ... civilian prisoners trickled into Confederate military prisons whether the writ of habeas corpus was suspended or not."

The last suspension lapsed in August 1864, amid deep domestic opposition to the suspension, including from the Confederate vice president Alexander H. Stephens, Davis's political rival.  Citing "discontent, disaffection, and disloyalty", Davis made entreaties in late 1864 and 1865 about the necessity of suspension, but bills to further suspend habeas corpus failed in the Confederate Senate.

Suspension during Reconstruction

Following the end of the Civil War, numerous groups arose in the South to oppose Reconstruction, including the Ku Klux Klan. In response, Congress passed the Enforcement Acts in 1870–71. One of these, the Civil Rights Act of 1871, permitted the president to suspend habeas corpus if conspiracies against federal authority were so violent that they could not be checked by ordinary means. That same year, President Ulysses S. Grant suspended the writ of habeas corpus in nine South Carolina counties; the Act's sunset clause ended that suspension with the close of the next regular session of Congress.

Suspension in the Philippines

In response to continuing unrest, the Philippine Commission availed itself of an option in the Philippine Organic Act of 1902, and on January 31, 1905, requested that Governor-General Luke Edward Wright suspend the writ of habeas corpus. He did so the same day, and habeas corpus was suspended until he revoked his proclamation on October 15, 1905. The suspension gave rise to the United States Supreme Court case Fisher v. Baker, .

Habeas corpus during World War II
Immediately following the attack on Pearl Harbor, the governor of Hawaii Territory, Joseph Poindexter, at the specific request by Lieutenant General Walter Short, US Army, invoked the Hawaiian Organic Act,  (1900), suspended habeas corpus, and declared martial law. Short was recalled to Washington, D.C. two weeks after the attack and subsequently Hawaii was governed by US Army Lieutenant Generals Delos Emmons and Robert C. Richardson Jr. for the remainder of the war. In Duncan v. Kahanamoku, the United States Supreme Court held that the declaration of martial law did not permit the trial of civilians in military tribunals for offenses unrelated to the military (in this case, public drunkenness).

In 1942, eight German saboteurs, including two U.S. citizens, who had secretly entered the United States to attack its civil infrastructure as part of Operation Pastorius, were convicted by a secret military tribunal set up by President Franklin D. Roosevelt. In Ex parte Quirin (1942), the U.S. Supreme Court decided that the writ of habeas corpus did not apply, and that the military tribunal had jurisdiction to try the saboteurs, due to their status as unlawful combatants.

The period of martial law in Hawaii ended in October 1944. It was held in Duncan v. Kahanamoku (1946) that, although the initial imposition of martial law in December 1941 may have been lawful, due to the Pearl Harbor attack and threat of imminent invasion, by 1944 the imminent threat had receded and civilian courts could again function in Hawaii. The Organic Act therefore did not authorize the military to continue to keep civilian courts closed.

After the end of the war, several German prisoners held in American-occupied Germany petitioned the District Court for the District of Columbia for a writ of habeas corpus. In Johnson v. Eisentrager (1950), the U.S. Supreme Court decided that the American court system had no jurisdiction over German war criminals who had been captured in Germany, and had never entered U.S. soil.

Antiterrorism and Effective Death Penalty Act
In 1996, following the Oklahoma City bombing, Congress passed (91–8 in the Senate, 293–133 in the House) and President Clinton signed into law the Antiterrorism and Effective Death Penalty Act of 1996 (AEDPA). The AEDPA was intended to "deter terrorism, provide justice for victims, provide for an effective death penalty, and for other purposes." The AEDPA introduced one of the few limitations on habeas corpus. For the first time, its Section 101 set a statute of limitations of one year following conviction for prisoners to seek the writ. The Act limits the power of federal judges to grant relief unless the state court's adjudication of the claim has resulted in a decision that

 Is contrary to, or has involved an unreasonable application of clearly established federal law as determined by the Supreme Court of the United States; or
 Has resulted in a decision that was based on an unreasonable determination of the facts in light of the evidence presented in the state court proceeding.

It barred second or successive petitions generally but with several exceptions. Petitioners who had already filed a federal habeas petition were required first to secure authorization from the appropriate United States Court of Appeals, to ensure that such an exception was at least facially made out.

Habeas corpus in the 21st Century
The November 23, 2001 Presidential Military Order purported to give the President of the United States the power to detain non-citizens suspected of connection to terrorists or terrorism as enemy combatants. As such, that person could be held indefinitely, without charges being filed against him or her, without a court hearing, and without legal counsel. Many legal and constitutional scholars contended that these provisions were in direct opposition to habeas corpus, and the United States Bill of Rights and, indeed, in Hamdi v. Rumsfeld (2004) the U.S. Supreme Court re-confirmed the right of every American citizen to access habeas corpus even when declared to be an enemy combatant. The Court affirmed the basic principle that habeas corpus could not be revoked in the case of a citizen.

In Hamdan v. Rumsfeld (2006) Salim Ahmed Hamdan petitioned for a writ of habeas corpus, challenging that the military commissions set up by the Bush administration to try detainees at Guantanamo Bay "violate both the UCMJ and the four Geneva Conventions." In a 5-3 ruling the Court rejected Congress's attempts to strip the court of jurisdiction over habeas corpus appeals by detainees at Guantánamo Bay. Congress had previously passed the Department of Defense Appropriations Act, 2006  which stated in Section 1005(e), "Procedures for Status Review of Detainees Outside the United States":

On September 29, the U.S. House and Senate approved the Military Commissions Act of 2006, a bill which suspended habeas corpus for any alien determined to be an "unlawful enemy combatant engaged in hostilities or having supported hostilities against the United States" by a vote of 65-34.  (This was the result on the bill to approve the military trials for detainees; an amendment to remove the suspension of habeas corpus failed 48-51.) President Bush signed the Military Commissions Act of 2006 (MCA) into law on October 17, 2006. With the MCA's passage, the law altered the language from "alien detained ... at Guantanamo Bay":

The Supreme Court ruled in Boumediene v. Bush that the MCA amounts to an unconstitutional encroachment on habeas corpus rights, and established jurisdiction for federal courts to hear petitions for habeas corpus from Guantanamo detainees tried under the Act. Under the MCA, the law restricted habeas appeals for only those aliens detained as enemy combatants, or awaiting such determination. Left unchanged was the provision that, after such determination is made, it is subject to appeal in federal courts, including a review of whether the evidence warrants the determination. If the status was upheld, then their imprisonment was deemed lawful; if not, then the government could change the prisoner's status to something else, at which point the habeas restrictions no longer applied.

There is, however, no legal time limit which would force the government to provide a Combatant Status Review Tribunal hearing. Prisoners were, but are no longer, legally prohibited from petitioning any court for any reason before a CSRT hearing takes place.

In January 2007, Attorney General Alberto Gonzales told the Senate Judiciary Committee that in his opinion: "There is no express grant of habeas in the Constitution. There's a prohibition against taking it away." He was challenged by Sen. Arlen Specter who asked him to explain how it is possible to prohibit something from being taken away, without first being granted. Robert Parry wrote in the Baltimore Chronicle & Sentinel:

The Department of Justice in the George W. Bush administration took the position in litigation that the Military Commissions Act of 2006 does not amount to a suspension of the writ of habeas corpus. The U.S. Court of Appeals for the D.C. Circuit agreed in a 2-1 decision, on February 20, 2007, which the U.S. Supreme Court initially declined to review. The U.S. Supreme Court then reversed its decision to deny review and took up the case in June 2007. In June 2008, the court ruled 5-4 that the act did suspend habeas and found it unconstitutional.

On June 11, 2007, a federal appeals court ruled that Ali Saleh Kahlah al-Marri, a legal resident of the United States, could not be detained indefinitely without charge. In a two-to-one ruling by the U.S. Court of Appeals for the Fourth Circuit, the Court held the President of the United States lacks legal authority to detain al-Marri without charge; all three judges ruled that al-Marri is entitled to traditional habeas corpus protections which give him the right to challenge his detainment in a U.S. Court. In July 2008, the U.S. Court of Appeals for the Fourth Circuit ruled that "if properly designated an enemy combatant pursuant to the legal authority of the President, such persons may be detained without charge or criminal proceedings for the duration of the relevant hostilities."

The Habeas Corpus Restoration Act of 2007 failed to overcome a Republican filibuster in the United States Senate in September, 2007.

On October 7, 2008, U.S. District Judge Ricardo M. Urbina ruled that 17 Uyghurs, Muslims from China's northwestern Xinjiang region, must be brought to appear in his court in Washington, DC, three days later:
"Because the Constitution prohibits indefinite detentions without cause, the continued detention is unlawful."

On January 21, 2009, President Barack Obama issued an executive order regarding the Guantanamo Bay Naval Base and the individuals held there. This order stated that the detainees "have the constitutional privilege of the writ of habeas corpus."

Following the December 1, 2011, vote by the United States Senate to reject an NDAA amendment proscribing the indefinite detention of U.S. citizens, the ACLU has argued that the legitimacy of Habeas Corpus is threatened:
"The Senate voted 38-60 to reject an important amendment [that] would have removed harmful provisions authorizing the U.S. military to pick up and imprison without charge or trial civilians, including American citizens, anywhere in the world... We're disappointed that, despite robust opposition to the harmful detention legislation from virtually the entire national security leadership of the government, the Senate said 'no' to the Udall amendment and 'yes' to indefinite detention without charge or trial." The New York Times has stated that the vote leaves the constitutional rights of U.S. citizens "ambiguous," with some senators including Carl Levin and Lindsey Graham arguing that the Supreme Court had already approved holding Americans as enemy combatants, and other senators, including Dianne Feinstein and Richard Durbin, asserting the opposite.

On March 20, 2015, a New York Supreme Court justice issued an order to "show cause & writ of habeas corpus" in a proceeding on behalf of two chimpanzees used in research at Stony Brook University. The justice, Barbara Jaffe, amended her order later in the day by striking the reference to habeas corpus.

Differences in post-trial actions
Habeas corpus is an action often taken after sentencing by a defendant who seeks relief for some perceived error in his criminal trial. There are a number of such post-trial actions and proceedings, their differences being potentially confusing, thus bearing some explanation. Some of the most common are an appeal to which the defendant has as a right, a writ of certiorari, a writ of coram nobis and a writ of habeas corpus.

An appeal to which the defendant has a right cannot be abridged by the court which is, by designation of its jurisdiction, obligated to hear the appeal. In such an appeal, the appellant feels that some error has been made in his trial, necessitating an appeal. A matter of importance is the basis on which such an appeal might be filed: generally appeals as a matter of right may only address issues which were originally raised in trial (as evidenced by documentation in the official record). Any issue not raised in the original trial may not be considered on appeal and will be considered waived via estoppel. A convenient test for whether a petition is likely to succeed on the grounds of error is confirming that
a mistake was indeed made
an objection to that mistake was presented by counsel and
that mistake negatively affected the defendant's trial.

A writ of certiorari, otherwise known simply as cert, is an order by a higher court directing a lower court to send record of a case for review, and is the next logical step in post-trial procedure. While states may have similar processes, a writ of cert is usually only issued, in the United States, by the Supreme Court, although some states retain this procedure. Unlike the aforementioned appeal, a writ of cert is not a matter of right. A writ of cert will have to be petitioned for, the higher court issuing such writs on limited bases according to constraints such as time. In another sense, a writ of cert is like an appeal in its constraints; it too may only seek relief on grounds raised in the original trial.

A petition for a writ of error coram nobis or error coram vobis challenges a final judgment in a criminal proceeding. Use of this type of petition varies from jurisdiction to jurisdiction, but is usually limited to situations where it was not possible to raise this issue earlier on direct appeal. These petitions focus on issues outside the original premises of the trial, i.e., issues that require new evidence or those that could not otherwise be raised by direct appeal or writs of cert. These often fall in two logical categories: (1) that the trial lawyer was ineffectual or incompetent or (2) that some constitutional right has been violated.

Federal habeas corpus statistics

Number of cases
In 2004, there were about 19,000 non-capital federal habeas corpus petitions filed and there were about 210 capital federal habeas corpus petitions filed in U.S. District Court. The vast majority of these were from state prisoners, not from those held in federal prisons. There are about 60 habeas corpus cases filed in the U.S. Supreme Court's original jurisdiction each year. The U.S. Courts of Appeal do not have original jurisdiction over habeas corpus petitions.

Types of cases in which petitions are filed
In 1992, less than 1% of federal habeas corpus petitions involved death penalty sentences, although 21% involved life sentences. At that time about 23% had been convicted of homicide, about 39% had been convicted of other serious violent crimes, about 27% had been convicted of serious non-violent crimes, and about 12% were convicted of other offenses. These are almost exclusively state offenses and thus petitions filed by state prisoners.

Exhaustion of state-court remedies often takes five to ten years after a conviction, so only state prisoners facing longer prison sentences are able to avail themselves of federal habeas corpus rights without facing a summary dismissal for failure to exhaust state remedies. The lack of state remedies to exhaust also means that the timeline for federal death penalty habeas review is much shorter than the timeline for state death penalty habeas review (which can drag on literally for decades).

In 2004, the percentage of federal habeas corpus petitions involving state death sentences was still about 1% of the total.

Success rates
About 63% of issues raised in habeas corpus petitions by state court prisoners are dismissed on procedural grounds at the U.S. District Court level, and about 35% of those issues are dismissed based on the allegations in the petition on the merits (on the merits has a different meaning than what it's used for here). About 2% are either "remanded" to a state court for further proceedings (which poses an interesting problem of federalism – the federal court usually issues a writ to the state prison to release the prisoner, but only if the state court does not hold a certain proceeding within a certain time), or, far less frequently, resolved favorably to the prisoner on the merits outright. About 57% of habeas corpus issues dismissed on procedural grounds in 1992 were dismissed for a failure to exhaust state remedies.

Success rates are not uniform, however. James Liebman, Professor of Law at Columbia Law School, stated in 1996 that his study found that when habeas corpus petitions in death penalty cases were traced from conviction to completion of the case that there was "a 40 percent success rate in all capital cases from 1978 to 1995."  Similarly, a study by Ronald Tabek in a law review article puts the success rate in habeas corpus cases involving death row inmates even higher, finding that between "1976 and 1991, approximately 47% of the habeas petitions filed by death row inmates were granted." Most habeas corpus petitioners in death penalty cases are represented by attorneys, but most habeas corpus petitioners in non-death penalty cases represent themselves. This is because federal funds are not available to non-capital state habeas petitioners to pay for attorneys unless there is good cause, there being no federal right to counsel in such matters. However, in state capital cases, the federal government provides funding for the representation of all capital habeas petitioners.

Thus, about 20% of successful habeas corpus petitions involve death penalty cases.

These success rates predate major revisions in habeas corpus law that restricted the availability of federal habeas corpus relief when AEDPA was adopted in 1996, over a decade ago. Post-AEDPA, the great disparity in success rates remains, however, with the federal courts' overturning of state capital cases a major reason that many states have been unable to carry out a majority of capital sentences imposed and have long backlog lists.

Disposition time
The time required to adjudicate habeas corpus petitions varies greatly based upon factors including the number of issues raised, whether the adjudication is on procedural grounds or on the merits, and the nature of the claims raised.

In 1992, U.S. District Courts took an average of two and a half years to adjudicate habeas corpus petitions in death penalty cases raising multiple issues that were resolved on the merits, about half of that time-length for other multiple issue homicide cases, and about nine months in cases resolved on procedural grounds.

AEDPA was designed to reduce the disposition times of federal habeas corpus petitions. But AEDPA has a little impact in non-capital cases, where a majority of cases are dismissed on procedural grounds, very few prisoners prevail and most prisoners are not represented by attorneys. The disposition time in capital cases has actually increased 250% from the time of AEDPA's passage to 2004.

Filing rates
In 1991, the average number of federal habeas corpus petitions filed in the United States was 14 per 1,000 people in state prison, but this ranged greatly from state to state from a low of 4 per 1,000 in Rhode Island to a high of 37 per 1,000 in Missouri.

The Anti-Terrorism and Effective Death Penalty Act of 1996 (AEDPA) produced a brief surge in the number of habeas corpus filings by state prisoners, as deadlines imposed by the act encouraged prisoners to file sooner than they might have otherwise done so, but this had run its course by 2000, and by 2004, habeas corpus petition filing rates per 1,000 prisoners was similar to pre-AEDPA filing rates.

There was a temporary surge in habeas corpus petitions filed by federal prisoners in 2005 as a result of the Booker decision by the U.S. Supreme Court.

References

Further reading
 Wert Justin J. Habeas Corpus in America: The Politics of Individual Rights (University Press of Kansas; 2011) 296 pages; how presidents, Congress, interest groups, legal scholars, and others have shaped it.

External links

 Petition for Habeas Corpus April 16, 1843 From Texas Tides